Toska is an island in Alver Municipality in Vestland county, Norway.  The  island lies just west of the island of Radøy in the Hjeltefjorden, at the entrance to the Radfjorden.

A road connection from the village of Manger on Radøy island to the island of Toska was completed in 1989.  The island is a popular holiday destination.  Toska has about 40 inhabitants, mostly living in the village of Toska, also known as Vestevågen.

There are still a few farmers left on the island, but most residents work in other professions, with many commuting to neighboring villages and even to the city of Bergen.

See also
List of islands of Norway

References

Islands of Vestland
Alver (municipality)